London is a 2005 Indian Tamil-language comedy-drama film written by Badri and directed by Sundar C. It is a remake of the 2001 Malayalam film Kakkakuyil. The film stars Prashanth and Pandiarajan, while Vadivelu, Ankitha, Mumtaj, Vijaykumar and Srividya  play supporting roles. Vidyasagar composed the film's music. This was the last awaited Tamil film to date of late actress Srividya, just a year before her untimely demise. The film was released on 11 March 2005 and became a commercial hit.

Plot
Shiva Raman, an easy-going young man from Chennai, comes to London (UK) in search of a job, but loses all of his certificates. He finds Kathiravan wandering in London aimlessly without a job. Now, they both need job and money. Kathir persuades Shiva to join a bank robbery planned by Bhaskharan. His stammering brother Natrajan and Aishwarya, who is Bhaskaran's lover, are in on the job. Aishwarya informs the police about the robbery and tells that the entire plan was hatched by Bhaskaran. Bhaskaran hides the money before getting arrested, and the place is known only to his lawyer Vedimuthu. Aishwarya pretends to be in love with Vedimuthu to find where the money is hidden.

Meanwhile, to find a safe cover, Shiva and Kathir plan to imitate Saravanan, the grandson of a rich elderly couple: Rajasekar and his wife Parvathi. They have not seen their grandchild since his birth. Shiva and Kathir end up feigning to be Kadhir's body and Shiva's voice to make up for Saravanan in front of the blind couple. Ganesh, who knows Kathir before, makes several attempts to expose the truth to the couple, but all fail, due to Shiva and Kadhir's luck. All of a sudden, Anjali arrives pretending to be Saravanan's lover. She calls on all the relatives of Rajasekar and Parvathi. The relatives arrive in Shiva's absence. Finding no way out, Kathir pretends to have fainted, and he is admitted to the hospital. Shiva comes to his rescue, and says that he is Dr. Karthikeyan, a friend of Saravanan from America.

Amidst their drama, Kathir tries to steal the Lord Muruga statue, for which he plays a trick to injure Parvathi, which keeps all others out of the house for sometime. Shiva engages in a fight with Kathir when he tries to leave with the statue that he had stolen. Rajasekar accuses his relatives for his wife's accident and asks all of his relatives to leave at once. Shiva and Kathir get separated and part ways. A drunk Ganesh finally manages to reveal the truth to Rajasekar about Saravan's death in an accident following which Anjali reveals the truth to him that she is actually Saravanan's secretary and had come to explain about Saravanan's death in an accident in America. She also explains that Siva and Kathir were acting/posing as Saravanan & that she took part in the drama not wanting to ruin their happiness. After revealing all this, she gives them money and asks them to get out of the house. Shiva, realizing his mistake, refuses to take the money and asks Kathir not to take the money. Kathir leaves Shiva in anger, taking the money with him. Shiva returns to Rajasekar and confesses all of his mistakes. Rajasekar asks them to continue the drama for the sake of his wife, who loves her grandson more than her life. Parvathy comes and calls Saravanan but gets no replies. She finally gets hold of the arms of Kathir, who has returned in remorse. Hence, the movie happily ends with the marriage of Shiva and Anjali, who by now have fallen in love with each other.

Cast 

Prashanth as Shiva Raman "Shiva"/Saravanan's voice
Pandiarajan as Kathiravan "Kathir" /Saravanan's body
Vadivelu as Advocate Vedimuthu
Ankitha as Anjali
Mumtaj as Aishwarya "Ais"
Vijayakumar as Rajasekar, Saravanan's grandfather
Srividya as Parvathi, Saravanan's grandmother
Nalini as Baby, Vedimuthu's legal wife
Manivannan as Bhaskharan alias Boss
Delhi Ganesh as Ganeshan alias Kudikaran
Mayilsamy as Natrajan Krishna Moorthi alias Nattu Kicchu
Chitra Lakshmanan as Rajkumar
Vichu Vishwanath
Brinda Das as Rajalakshmi alias Raji
Lakshmi Rattan as Family Doctor

Production
Prashanth and Sundar C had previously worked together in the successful 2003 action film Winner, and chose to work again in a film titled London in mid 2004. Meera Jasmine was the team's initial choice for the lead actress, but she later opted out citing date issues. Ankitha, previously seen in Telugu films, was added to the cast in October 2004 to play the lead female role. Mumtaj, Vadivelu, Manivannan and Pandiarajan were added to the cast and the film was described to be an "out and out comedy". The film was announced to be the first Tamil film production of Spice Team Entertainment, a wing of Inspired Movies in the UK and also signed up to distribute the film.

In late 2004, the team shot scenes for 25 days across London and due to the early sunset, ended up having early starts to make use of the daylight hours. Scenes were filmed primarily in studios in Chennai, though outdoor scenes were shot near Buckingham Palace and Piccadilly Circus amongst other locations. The film was completed and ready for release in February 2005 and Prashanth opted to release London before his other completed film, Adaikalam.

Music 

The soundtrack consists of six songs composed by Vidyasagar, and was released on 24 February 2005.

Release
The film opened in March 2005 to predominantly positive reviews from film critics, who praised the film's entertainment value. Malathi Rangarajan of The Hindu revealed "London comically stresses on the importance of wealth in this mercenary world and in the bargain logic, credulity and spontaneity go for a toss." Sify.com gave the film a positive review noting that "Please leave your logical mind at home when you watch a Sundar.C film. The trio of Prashanth-Sundar.C-Vadivelu has a “Winner” in London".

Critics from Indiaglitz.com noted "If you forget a thing called logic, this is indeed a hilarious roller-coaster ride." The critic added that "Prashanth, as Sivaraman and Saravanan, does not complicate things. He sticks to a neat and simple path. Ankitha has nothing much to do, except simpler and look good. And she does look ravishing." Another reviewer added "on the whole Sundar.C has given a colorful movie which people could sit through, laugh, smile and relax for two and half hours." Thiraipadam.com wrote, "Prashanth seems lost in the ocean of characters surrounding him and is mostly a spectator to the goings-on around him. Ankitha's face looks kinda asymmetrical and she certainly doesn't deserve the accolades Prashanth heaps on her in a song. Pandiarajan raises a few laughs in Prashanth's company. Vadivelu is very funny both when drooling over Mumtaj and when caught in some unexplainable position with Nalini. Mumtaj gets to do more than an item number while Vijayakumar and Srividya are solid. Only Yaaro Oruthi makes an impression in Vidyasagar's otherwise weak soundtrack." The film was later dubbed and released in Telugu as Namasthe London by Gayatri Movies.

References

External links
 

2005 films
Films shot in London
Tamil remakes of Malayalam films
2000s Tamil-language films
Films scored by Vidyasagar
Films directed by Sundar C.
Indian comedy films